Call Me When You Get There is an album by bassist Barre Phillips recorded in 1983 and released on the ECM label.

Reception

AllMusic awarded the album 4 stars.

Track listing
All compositions by Barre Phillips
 "Grant's Pass" - 8:08  
 "Craggy Slope" - 4:57  
 "Amos Crown's Barn" - 4:00  
 "Pittman's Rock" - 4:59  
 "Highway 37" - 3:37  
 "Winslow Cavern" - 4:25  
 "Riverbend" - 4:13  
 "Brewstertown 2" - 5:28

Personnel
Barre Phillips — bass

References

ECM Records albums
Barre Phillips albums
1983 albums
Albums produced by Manfred Eicher